Memphis City Schools (MCS) was the school district operating public schools in the city of Memphis, Tennessee, United States. It was headquartered in the Frances E. Coe Administration Building. On March 8, 2011, residents voted to disband the city school district, effectively merging it with the Shelby County School District. The merger took effect July 1, 2013. After much legal maneuvering, all six incorporated municipalities (other than Memphis) created separate school districts in 2014.
Total enrollment, as of the 2010-2011 school year, was about 103,000 students, which made the district the largest in Tennessee.

MCS served the entire city of Memphis. Some areas of unincorporated Shelby County were zoned to Memphis City Schools from Kindergarten through 12th grade. Some unincorporated areas of Shelby County were zoned to schools in Shelby County Schools for elementary and middle school and Memphis City Schools for high school.

As of August 2014 there are six new municipal school districts. Collierville Schools, Bartlett City Schools, Millington Municipal Schools, Germantown Municipal Schools, Arlington Community Schools and Lakeland School System. Shelby County Schools serves the city of Memphis and as well the  unincorporated areas of Shelby County.

History

In the mid-1960s, the district had about 130,000 students. The numbers of white students and black students were almost equal.

In the mid-1960s, the district still segregated its schools. Daniel Kiel, a law professor at the University of Memphis who had authored publications about school integration in Memphis, said that the efforts to desegregate were, as paraphrased by Sam Dillon of The New York Times, "subterfuge and delay". Desegregation first began with the Memphis 13, a group of first graders. In 1973, the federal government ordered desegregation busing in Memphis. As a result, massive white flight occurred in Memphis City Schools. In 1973, the school district had 71,000 White students. In a period of four years, 40,000 of the White students left.

In July 2011, the Memphis City Schools Board of Commissioners voted to postpone opening Memphis City Schools indefinitely until the Memphis City Council provided money set aside for the school system. The incident was reported in national news.

In 2011 Marcus Pohlmann, a Rhodes College political science professor, wanted to study the Memphis schools to compare performances of schools with low income student bodies and schools with higher income student bodies. He concluded that he was unable to do so because "There are no middle-class black schools in Memphis. They’re all poor."

School uniforms
All MCS students were required to wear school uniforms from the fall of 2002 until the district was dissolved in 2013. Students could wear oxford shirts, polo shirts, turtlenecks, and blouses with "Peter Pan" collars. Colors varied, depending upon the school. In general, all white shirts were acceptable. Sweatshirts had to be white, black, navy blue, tan or any other colors approved by the individual campus. Trousers, shorts, skirts, and jumpers had to be black, tan, or navy blue. Denim clothing was not allowed. When MCS and SCS merged in 2013, the former MCS schools kept this uniform policy while the existing SCS schools did not, since the suburbs planned to form their own districts and leave SCS within a year.

Schools

K-12 schools
Alternative
 Avon-Lenox School

Secondary schools

7-12 schools
Zoned

 Bellevue Middle School
 East Career and Technology Center
 Kingsbury Middle/High School
 Oakhaven Middle/High School
 Treadwell Middle/High School

High schools
Zoned

 George Washington Carver High School
 Central High School
 Cordova High School (Unincorporated Shelby County)
 Craigmont High School
 Douglass High School
 East High School (Formerly a middle and high school)
 Fairley High School
 Frayser High School (Formerly a middle and high school)
 Germantown High School
 Hamilton High School
 Kirby High School
 Manassas High School
 Melrose High School
 Mitchell High School
 Northside High School
 Watkins Overton High School
 Raleigh-Egypt High School
 Ridgeway High School
 Sheffield High School
 Southside High School
 Trezevant High School (Formerly a middle and high school)
 Booker T. Washington High School
 Westwood High School
 White Station High School
 Whitehaven High School
 Wooddale High School

Alternative
 Middle College High School

Middle schools
6-8
 Cordova Middle School

6-8

 Airways Middle School
 American Way Middle School
 Bellevue Middle School
 Colonial Middle School
 Corry Middle School
 Craigmont Middle School
 Cypress Middle School
 Fairview Middle School
 Geeter Middle School
 Hamilton Middle School
 Havenview Middle School
 Hickory Ridge Middle School
 Humes Middle School
 Kirby Middle School
 Lanier Middle School
 Raleigh-Egypt Middle School
 Ridgeway Middle School
 Riverwood Middle School
 Sherwood Middle School
 South Side Middle School
 Vance Middle School
 A. Maceo Walker Middle School
 Westside Middle School (a 7-12 school until 07-08)
 White Station Middle School (Wikipedia)
 Wooddale Middle School

7-8
 Chickasaw Middle School
 Georgian Hills Middle School

K-8 schools
Zoned
 Lester School
 Snowden School

Alternative
 John P. Freeman Optional School

K-7 schools
Zoned
 Douglass School

Elementary schools

Zoned elementary schools
K-6

 Berclair Elementary School
 Brookmeade Elementary School
 Lucie E. Campbell Elementary School
 Corning Elementary School
 Coro Lake Elementary School
 Denver Elementary School
 Double Tree Elementary School
 Downtown Elementary School
 Ford Road Elementary School
 Frayser Elementary School
 Georgian Hills Elementary School
 Grahamwood Elementary School
 Grandview Heights Elementary School
 Graves Elementary School
 Hawkins Mill Elementary School
 Jackson Elementary School
 Kingsbury Elementary School
 Levi Elementary School
 Oakhaven Elementary School
 Shelby Oaks Elementary School
 Treadwell Elementary School
 Wells Station Elementary School
 Westside Elementary School
 Westwood Elementary School
 White's Chapel Elementary School
 Whitney Elementary School

K-5

 Alcy Elementary School
 Alton Elementary School
 Balmoral/Ridgeway Elementary School
 Kate Bond Elementary School (Unincorporated Shelby County)
 Bethel Grove Elementary School
 William Brewster Elementary School
 Brownsville Road Elementary School
 Bruce Elementary School
 Caldwell Elementary School
 Carnes Elementary School
 Charjean Elementary School
 Cherokee Elementary School
 Robert R. Church Elementary School
 Coleman Elementary School
 Cromwell Elementary School
 Crump Elementary School
 Cummings Elementary School
 Dunbar Elementary School
 Egypt Elementary School
 Evans Elementary School
 Fairley Elementary School
 Florida-Kansas Elementary School
 Fox Meadows Elementary School
 Gardenview Elementary School
 Georgia Avenue Elementary School
 Germanshire Elementary School
 Getwell Elementary School
 Goodlett Elementary School
 Gordon Elementary School
 Graceland Elementary School
 Guthrie Elementary School
 Hamilton Elementary School
 Hanley Elementary School
 Hickory Ridge Elementary School
 A. B. Hill Elementary School
 Holmes Road Elementary School
 Idlewild Elementary School
 Keystone Elementary School
 Klondike Elementary School
 Knight Road Elementary School
 Lakeview Elementary School
 LaRose Elementary School
 Lincoln Elementary School
 Magnolia Elementary School
 Manor Lake Elementary School
 Newberry Elementary School
 Norris Elementary School
 Oak Forest Elementary School
 Oakshire Elementary School
 Orleans Elementary School
 Peabody Elementary School
 Rainshaven Elementary School
 Raleigh-Bartlett Meadows Elementary School
 Richland Elementary School
 Riverview Elementary School
 Ross Elementary School
 Rozelle Elementary School
 Scenic Hills Elementary School
 Sea Isle Elementary School
 Shady Grove Elementary School
 Shannon Elementary School
 Sharpe Elementary School
 Sheffield Elementary School
 Sherwood Elementary School
 South Park Elementary School
 Spring Hill Elementary School
 Springdale Elementary School
 Vollentine Elementary School
 Westhaven Elementary School
 White Station Elementary
 Whitehaven Elementary School
 Willow Oaks Elementary School
 Winchester Elementary School
 Winridge Elementary School
 Whites Chapel Elementary School

1-5
 Campus School

K-4
 Cordova Elementary School

Alternative elementary schools
K-6
 Delano Elementary school

Former schools

Former elementary schools
 Hollywood Elementary School (closed spring 2007) (Students reassigned to Springdale Elementary School)
 Lauderdale Elementary School (closed spring 2007) (Students reassigned to Larose Elementary School)
 Macon Elementary School (closed spring 2007) (Students reassigned to Berclair Elementary School)
 Ridgeway Elementary School was merged into Balmoral Elementary in spring 2007. The building underwent moderate renovations to accommodate what is currently Ridgeway High School's Ninth Grade Freshmen Academy.
 Graves Elementary School, closed in 2014.

Former secondary schools
 Longview Middle School (closed spring 2007)

Former high schools
 Humes High School
 Messick High School
 Memphis Technical High School
Southside High School

Blue Ribbon Schools
Seven Memphis City Schools have been recognized by the U.S. Department of Education's Blue Ribbon Schools Program, which honors schools that are academically superior or demonstrate dramatic gains in student achievement. These schools are:
 1982-83 — Snowden School
 1985-86 — Grahamwood School
 1992-93 — Craigmont Junior/Senior High School
 1993-94 — Richland Elementary School
 2004 — Keystone Elementary
 2005 — Delano Elementary School
 2008 — John P. Freeman Optional School

Other facilities
Memphis City Schools was headquartered in the Francis E. Coe Administration Building, It was shared with the pre-merger Shelby County Schools. The building has two wings, one for each district. As of 2013 the corridor linking the wings had a double-locked doors, and the glass panels had been covered by particle boards. Irving Hamer, the deputy superintendent of Memphis City Schools, described the barrier as "our Berlin Wall."

See also

 History of Memphis, Tennessee
 List of high schools in Tennessee
 List of school districts in Tennessee
 Shelby County Schools
 WQOX, a radio station owned by Memphis City Schools

References

Further reading
 Collins, Thomas W. and George W. Noblit. "Stratification and Resegregation: The Case of Crossover High School, Memphis, Tennessee." (Archive) - Info page. ERIC Number: ED157954.
 Noblit, George W. and Thomas W. Collins. School flight and school policy: Desegregation and resegregation in the Memphis City Schools. The Urban Review, Kluwer Academic Publishers. Fall 1978 (Cover date September 1, 1978), Volume 10, Issue 3, pp 203–212. DOI 10.1007/BF02174224. DOI 10.1007/BF02174224, Print ISSN 0042-0972, Online ISSN 1573-1960.
 Pohlmann, Marcus D. Opportunity Lost: Race and Poverty in the Memphis City Schools. University of Tennessee Press, 2008.

External links
 
 
 SCSK12.org - Official Shelby County Schools Website

City Schools
2013 disestablishments in Tennessee
Educational institutions disestablished in 2013
Former school districts in the United States
School districts in Shelby County, Tennessee